Cizur is a town and municipality located in the province and autonomous community of Navarre, northern Spain.

Councils
The municipality is composed of 8 councils : 
 Astráin / Asterain
 Cizur Menor / Zizur Txikia
 Gazólaz / Gatzolatz
 Larraya / Larraia
 Muru-Astráin / Muru Asterain
 Paternáin / Baternain
 Undiano / Undio
 Zariquiegui / Zarikiegi

3 populated places: Eriete, Guenduláin (Gendulain) and Sagüés (Sagues).

References

External links
 CIZUR in the Bernardo Estornés Lasa - Auñamendi Encyclopedia (Euskomedia Fundazioa) 

Municipalities in Navarre